The Jackie Chan J-Mat Fitness is a mat serving as a video game requiring a XaviXPORT console to operate. This 2005 game, similar to the later released Nintendo game Wii Fit, is made to make players exercise. The players control Jackie Chan in a variety of modes such as reflex mode, running and exercising (which is played in a similar style to Dance Dance Revolution games).

Articles 

 Kotaku - "Jackie Chan Kind of Invented Wii Fit"
 Siliconera - "Jackie Chan's Take on Wii Fit"

2005 video games
Fitness games
Jackie Chan video games
Video games developed in Japan